Nocturama is the twelfth studio album by Nick Cave and the Bad Seeds, released on February 3, 2003 on Mute and ANTI-. Produced by Nick Launay, the album is the last to feature founding member Blixa Bargeld who departed from the band shortly after the album's release.

Recording
Nocturama was recorded in one week during an Australian tour in March 2002, and reunited Nick Cave and guitarist Mick Harvey with producer Nick Launay, who had worked with their previous band The Birthday Party twenty-one years earlier.

Reflecting on the recording experience, Launay noted: "I'll never forget the first day recording Nocturama. Blixa swept into SingSing Studio in that hat. Mick Harvey introduces me and Blixa goes, 'Oh, ja, the engineer.' Mick says, 'No, Blixa – the producer.' Blixa says, 'Well, we'll see about that, won't we?' From a distance they look like the most chaotic band. From an engineering point of view, it's just fucking mental – like recording a live gig but you're capturing this thing for ever. As soon as Nick walks in and sits at the piano, you're recording. The intensity is unlike any other band."

Track listing
All songs written by Nick Cave.

"Wonderful Life" – 6:49
"He Wants You" – 3:30
"Right Out of Your Hand" – 5:15
"Bring It On" – 5:22
"Dead Man in My Bed" – 4:40
"Still in Love" – 4:44
"There Is a Town" – 4:58
"Rock of Gibraltar" – 3:00
"She Passed by My Window" – 3:20
"Babe, I'm on Fire" – 14:45

Singles
 "Bring It On" (MUTE 265) (February 24, 2003)
 "Bring It On" (Edit) b/w: "Shoot Me Down" / "Swing Low"
 "He Wants You" / "Babe, I'm on Fire" (MUTE 290) (June 2, 2003)
 "He Wants You" (Edit) / "Babe, I'm on Fire" (Edit) b/w: "Little Ghost Song" / "Everything Must Converge"
 "Rock of Gibraltar" (MUTE 318) (September 1, 2003)
 b/w: "Nocturama"

Personnel
Nick Cave and the Bad Seeds
 Nick Cave – Vocals (1–10),  Piano (1–3, 5–8, 10),  Hammond (1, 4–8, 10)
 Mick Harvey – Guitar (1, 3–7, 9, 10),  Backing Vocals (3, 5, 7, 10),  Organ (2, 9),  Acoustic Guitar (8),  Bass (8),  Bongos (1),  Triangle (1)
 Blixa Bargeld – Pedal Steel Guitar (1–3, 7, 9),  Guitar (4, 6, 10),  Backing Vocals (5, 10),  Inexplicable Guitar (5),  Gated Guitar (7)
 Thomas Wydler – Drums (1, 3, 5, 6, 8, 10),  Brush Snare (4, 7),  Shaker (2)
 Martyn P. Casey – Bass (1–7, 9, 10)
 Jim Sclavunos – Drums (2, 4, 7, 9),  Backing Vocals (7),  Percussion (10),  Tambourine (8)
 Warren Ellis – Violin (2–10)
 Conway Savage – Backing Vocals (3, 5, 7, 10)
Guest musicians
 Chris Bailey – chorus vocals on "Bring It On"
 Johnny Turnbull – backing vocals on "He Wants You", "Bring It On", "There Is a Town" and "She Passed by My Window"
 Norman Watt-Roy – backing vocals on "He Wants You", "Bring It On" and "There Is a Town"
 Mickey Gallagher – backing vocals on "He Wants You", "Bring It On",  "There Is a Town" and "She Passed by My Window"
 Chas Jankel – backing vocals on "He Wants You", "Bring It On" and "There Is a Town"

Sales

References

External links
 

2003 albums
Albums produced by Nick Launay
Anti- (record label) albums
Mute Records albums
Nick Cave albums